Saturn Arena is an arena in Ingolstadt, Germany.  It is primarily used for the ice hockey club ERC Ingolstadt. Saturn Arena opened in 2003 and holds 4,815 people.

External links 

Buildings and structures in Ingolstadt
Indoor arenas in Germany
Indoor ice hockey venues in Germany
Sport in Ingolstadt
Sports venues in Bavaria